Nimet Karakuş, (born January 23, 1993 in Korkuteli, Antalya Province, Turkey) is a Turkish sprinter competing in the 100 m and 200 m events.

Born to Bayram Karakuş and his wife Hatice in the outskirts of Antalya, she was discovered at the age of eleven as a sprinter. She won several races in her age category and became soon a national athlete.

She qualified to participate in the 100 m event at the 2012 Summer Olympics by improving her national record for juniors from 11.53 to 11.33.

AT the 2013 Islamic Solidarity Games held in Palembang, Indonesia, Karakuş won a silver medal in the 100 m event and a gold medal in the 4 × 100 m relay with her teammates Saliha Özyurt, Birsen Engin and Sema Apak.

Achievements

References

External links
 

1993 births
People from Korkuteli
Living people
Turkish female hurdlers
Turkish female sprinters
Fenerbahçe athletes
Olympic athletes of Turkey
Athletes (track and field) at the 2012 Summer Olympics
Mediterranean Games bronze medalists for Turkey
Athletes (track and field) at the 2013 Mediterranean Games
Mediterranean Games medalists in athletics
Islamic Solidarity Games competitors for Turkey
Islamic Solidarity Games medalists in athletics
21st-century Turkish women